The 2022 Asian Amateur Boxing Championships were held from 1 to 12 November 2022 in Amman, Jordan. It was the third time in the tournament's history that men and women fought in the same championship.

Medal summary

Men

Women

Medal table

References

External links
Results

2022
Asian Amateur
International boxing competitions hosted by Jordan
Asian Amateur Boxing Championships
Sports competitions in Amman
Asian Amateur Boxing Championships